often shortened to Manabi Straight!, is a Japanese multimedia project co-developed by the animation studio Ufotable and MediaWorks. The project revolves around a group of high school girls in the year 2035 when the birth rate has dropped dramatically. It launched in August 2004 in MediaWorks' Dengeki AniMaga magazine, and went on to produce a manga adaptation serialized in MediaWorks' Dengeki Daioh, and a second manga serialized in Enterbrain's Famitsu Comic Clear. A 12-episode anime series aired on TV Tokyo between January and March 2007, and is complemented by an original video animation (OVA) episode released exclusively on DVD in October 2007. Discotek Media licensed the series and OVA for release in North America in 2019. A PlayStation 2 visual novel based on the series was released in Japan in March 2007, developed by Marvelous Interactive.

Plot
Manabi Straight! is set in 2035 when the birth rate has dropped dramatically. As a result, some schools are being closed down because of a lack of students available to teach. Morale in schools has dropped dramatically, and the all-girl  is no exception. The story begins when the main character, Manami Amamiya, transfers to Seioh High School. Manami is an active girl with a positive personality, often shouting her personal motto  as a motivator for herself to go forward in life. On Manami's first day of school, the lone student council member and secretary Mika Inamori tries to rally students to join the council, but is initially met with an apathetic audience. However, Manami expresses interest in becoming the student council president. To show the school how much she wants to lead the student body, Manami begins to sing Seioh's school song after hearing it for the first time the day before. At the conclusion of the song, Manami is inducted as the student council president and received well by the entire school. The story that follows Manami working with Mika, and three other classmates—Mutsuki Uehara, Mei Etoh, and Momoha Odori—in student council matters, despite Manami and Mika initially being the only official members. After some remodeling of the student council room, Manami and her friends set forth to plan for the upcoming student festival.

Characters

It is mainly due to her uplifting personality that other students begin to have more vigor in their lives, in contrast to how bland life was before she transferred. After transferring to Seioh Private High School, she becomes the student council president, and sets forth to transform the lives of the students at the school so as give everyone a better experience while attending Seioh. One of her first decisions is to clean up and remodel the student council room into a café of sorts where any student can come and relax. This spurs a cooperation from many of the other clubs in the school, which helps brings the students together under one project.

Despite her enthusiasm to become the student council president early on Manami soon shows an incapability to lead even a joint student council meeting. Manami relies on her close friends for support for the things she wants to put forth for the sake of the school, while simultaneously giving her friends the motivation they need to continue work within the student council. She lives with her older brother Takefumi who is also her legal guardian.

As an only child, she has taken advantage of her position and has been spoiled by her parents. After meeting Manami, Mika becomes very attached to her. At first she was the only member in the student council, taking the position of secretary, but was later joined by Manami when she became the student council president.

At first she is unsure about Manami's strange enthusiasm and is unsure how to work with her within the council. As time passes, Mika begins to become more enthused herself by going along with Manami's plans to reform student life at Seioh. Mika seems to be the least mature of the five main characters, even going as far as to believe "little people" finished the work for the school festival promotional video while she, Minami and Mutsuki were sleeping.

In effect, sports clubs at school have invited her to participate in several club activities as an honorary member. Not wanting to turn them down, Mutsuki ends up participating in a multitude of other sports-club related activities in addition to the work she puts forth for the student council, despite initially not being an official member. This is due to her liking to help out where she is needed. She has a tomboyish personality, often hitting Mei on the back very hard and sporting a short haircut for a girl. Mutsuki's mannerisms are not feminine either and her voice is deeper than the typical female voice for her age.

Mutsuki has known Mei Etoh as far back as elementary school and often tries to get her to participate with the other main characters as a group rather than distance herself more from them. Mutsuki was the first person Mika became friends with upon entering high school. The two share an odd friendship as they have little in common. Mutsuki is eventually inducted into the student council as the assistant.

Mei secretly desires to be friendlier, but finds it difficult to express her emotions. This is due to an event in her past during elementary school when she was unanimously voted to be the class representative. Before long, the students in her class started shirking their own duties, in effect giving Mei all the work to do herself. After this treatment from her peers, Mei had lost faith in the intentions of people and distanced herself from others. When greeted by other students, Mei will usually not respond and just keep walking, apparently completely ignoring them, but is in fact too shy to engage in conversation. Mei has very little tolerance for school politics and sees school events for the waste of time that they are. Mei and Mutsuki have known each other since childhood, though Mei does not act like it.

After initially trying to organize the work of the student council, Mei gets inadvertently involved with the council's initial projects after Manami becomes the president, such as remodeling the student council room or helping to organize the inter-school dodgeball tournament. Mei is eventually inducted into the student council as the treasurer.

She does not talk much, which usually leaves her to not get directly involved with student council affairs. She is a member of the journalism club and broadcast committee, which serve as the reporters of school news either through printed articles or recorded interviews. She is always looking for interesting things to report on and carries around a digital video recorder. Her hobby is videotaping the events of the student council surrounding Manami and her friends.

Shimojima is the male teacher of Manami's class; Manami started to call him  and eventually the other main characters followed suit. He once came to work after drinking a little too much. Despite this, he has shown an interest in helping Manami in her endeavor in making school life more interesting for the students. Once he donated 5,000 yen to the student council and tried to help with the early planning of the student festival.

Takako is the student council president of Seioh's sister school . Her school is much more organized and has more money for school matters, such as for the student festival. She has a nice and helping attitude and has leadership abilities which likens her to that of the typical student council president.

Takefumi is Manami's older brother and is her only guardian, as their parents' whereabouts are unknown. While living together, he is in charge of most of the domestic chores around the house as Manami has to attend school. He loves and cares for his little sister very much and was very concerned once when her usual energetic attitude was completely depressed. He is dating the superintendent of Aikoh, Kyōko Kibukawa, a woman eight years his senior.

Media

Print
Manabi Straight! originally began as a reader-participation game whose development is directly influenced by the readers. The project launched in volume 12 of MediaWorks' Dengeki AniMaga magazine sold on August 30, 2004 with original character design and illustrations by Atsushi Ogasawara. The project continued until Dengeki AniMaga volume 19 when the magazine ceased publication on August 29, 2005.

The Manabi Straight! manga, with story by Ufotable and illustrated by Tartan Check, was serialized in MediaWorks' manga magazine Dengeki Daioh between the December 2005 and February 2008 issues. Four tankōbon volumes were released between May 27, 2006 and February 27, 2008. A second manga, titled , with story by Ufotable and illustrated by Eshika/Shōgo, was serialized in Enterbrain's online magazine Famitsu Comic Clear from January 30, 2015 to February 26, 2016. Two tankōbon volumes were released on August 12, 2015 and March 14, 2016.

Anime
A 12-episode anime television series produced by Ufotable aired in Japan between January 8 and March 26, 2007 on the TV Tokyo television network. An original video animation (OVA) episode was released on October 10, 2007. The production staff of Manabi Straight! removed the traditional "director" position and instead a team of studio producers and episode directors called  shared the burden together. Team Manabibeya includes the story director Ryunosuke Kingetsu, the animation director and character designer Atsushi Ogasawara, the layout director Takurowo Takahashi, and the technical director Takayuki Hirao. The opening theme is "A Happy Life" and the ending theme is "Lucky & Happy"; both are sung by Megumi Hayashibara. The single containing both songs was released on February 7, 2007. "A Happy Life" is a cover of Ritsuko Okazaki's 1996 single, while "Lucky & Happy" is a cover of a song written by Okazaki for the anime Wedding Peach. Discotek Media licensed the series and OVA for an April 30, 2019 Blu-ray release in North America.

Five character mini albums were released between September 6, 2006 and January 1, 2007 featuring the characters of Manami Amamiya, Mika Inamori, Mutsuki Uehara, Mei Etoh, and Momoha Odori, sung by their respective voice actresses from the anime. Two original soundtracks were released for the anime on February 21 and May 16, 2007. The soundtracks featured background music tracks, remixes of the songs featured on the character mini albums, and original songs. A single titled "Seioh Gakuen Kōka Band", sung by Yui Horie and Minori Chihara, was released on March 21, 2007; the single contained the two insert songs found in episode 11 of the anime.

Visual novel
A visual novel developed by Marvelous Interactive for the PlayStation 2 titled  was first released on March 29, 2007 in limited and regular editions. The limited edition came bundled with a thirty-minute length drama CD and two background music CDs. The gameplay consists of the player interacting with the game by making choices at key times in the story. While the game consists of several different scenarios, the main one takes place during the summer festival. In the scenario, Manami needs the cooperation and comprehension of the town people in order to ensure the success of the event. Manami and her friends go through various missions in the game while they work and help the people in town get ready for the festival. As an original system built into the game, Manami has the power to give her friends "Hustle Points" that she uses to cheer her friends up during their various missions. An album titled Miracle Straight! was released on April 4, 2007 containing the opening and ending themes to the video game sung by Yui Horie, Ai Nonaka, Marina Inoue, Aya Hirano and Saki Fujita.

Notes

References

External links
Manabi Straight! at Starchild 
Manabi Straight! at TV Tokyo 
Visual novel official website 

2007 anime OVAs
2007 video games
Fiction set in 2035
Anime series based on manga
Comedy anime and manga
Dengeki Comics
Dengeki Daioh
Discotek Media
Drama anime and manga
Enterbrain manga
Kadokawa Dwango franchises
TV Tokyo original programming
Japan-exclusive video games
Marvelous Entertainment
PlayStation 2 games
PlayStation 2-only games
School life in anime and manga
Shōnen manga
Slice of life anime and manga
Ufotable
Video games based on anime and manga
Video games developed in Japan
Visual novels